Nuclear factor of activated T cells 2 interacting protein is a protein that in humans is encoded by the NFATC2IP gene.

References

External links 
 PDBe-KB provides an overview of all the structure information available in the PDB for Human NFATC2-interacting protein (NFATC2IP)